The archery competitions at the 2001 Southeast Asian Games took place from 11 to 15 September 2001 at the Bandaraya Square, Johor Bahru.

Medalists

Medal table

Men

Women

References

Archery at the Southeast Asian Games
Southeast Asian Games
2001 Southeast Asian Games events
2001 Southeast Asian Games